The 2014–15 Barangay Ginebra San Miguel season was the 35th season of the franchise in the Philippine Basketball Association (PBA).

Key dates

2014
August 24: The 2014 PBA Draft took place in Midtown Atrium, Robinson Place Manila.
September 9: Barangay Ginebra had an exhibition match against the Korean Basketball League team Changwon LG Sakers at the Smart Araneta Coliseum.

2015
January 5: Team manager Alfrancis Chua announced the reappointment of Ato Agustin as Ginebra head coach  after two conferences with Jeffrey Cariaso. Cariaso was then hired by Alaska as an assistant coach.
March 30: Barangay Ginebra fired head coach Ato Agustin. He was replaced by assistant coach Frankie Lim.

Draft picks

Roster

 

  Chua also serves as Barangay Ginebra's alternate governor.

Philippine Cup

Eliminations

Standings

Game log

Playoffs

Bracket

Commissioner's Cup

Eliminations

Standings

Game log

Playoffs

Bracket

Transactions

Trades

Pre-season

Commissioner's Cup

Recruited imports

(* Asian import)

References

Barangay Ginebra San Miguel seasons
Barangay Ginebra